This is a list of events held and scheduled by the Shooto, a mixed martial arts promotion based in the Japan.

Scheduled events

Past events

See also
 Shooto
 List of Shooto Champions

References

Shooto
Shooto